Apr. 23 - Eastern Orthodox liturgical calendar - Apr. 25

All fixed commemorations below are observed on May 7 by Eastern Orthodox Churches on the Old Calendar.

For April 24th, Orthodox Churches on the Old Calendar commemorate the Saints listed on April 11.

Saints

 Martyr Sabbas Stratelates ("the General") of Rome, and 70 soldiers with him (272)
 Martyrs Pasicrates, Valentine, and Julius, at Dorostolum in Moesia (297)
 Martyrs Eusebius, Neon, Leontius, Longinus, and four others, at Nicomedia (c. 303)
 Martyr Eutexios.
 Saint Innocent, priest, on the Mount of Olives (4th century)
 Venerable Thomas, Fool-for-Christ, of Syria (c. 550)
 Venerable Elizabeth the Wonderworker, of Constantinople (6th-8th centuries)
 Venerable Thaumastos (the Wonderworker) (6th century)
 Saint Xenophon, founder of Xenophontos monastery, Mt. Athos (c. 1018)

Pre-Schism Western saints

 Martyr Alexander of Lyons, and companions (c. 177)
 Martyrs Felix, Fortunatus, and Achilleus, at Valence in France (212) (see also: April 23)
 Saint Gregory of Elvira, Bishop of Elvira in the south of Spain (c. 394)
 Saint Dyfnan, born in Wales, he founded a church in Anglesey (5th century)
 Saint Deodatus of Blois (Dié), a hermit near Blois in France, later the town of Saint-Dié grew up around his cell (c. 525)
 Saint Honorius of Brescia, a hermit near Brescia in Italy who was chosen bishop of that city (c. 586)
 Saint Mellitus, the first Bishop of London in the Saxon period, the third Archbishop of Canterbury, and a member of the Gregorian mission sent to England (624)
 Saint Authaire (Oye) (7th century)
 Saints Bova and Doda (7th century)
 Saint Wilfrid, Bishop of York (709)
 Saint Egbert, Bishop, of Iona (729)

Post-Schism Orthodox saints

 Venerable Saints Sabbas and Alexis the Hermit, of the Kiev Caves (13th century)
 New Martyr Doukas of Mytilene, the tailor (1564)
 Saints Symeon (Stefan) (1656), Elias (Iorest) (1678) and Sava (Brancovici) (1683), Metropolitans of Ardeal, Transylvania, Confessors against the Calvinists.
 Venerable Joseph (Stoyka) the Confessor, Bishop of Maramureș, Romania (c. 1711)
 New Martyr Nicholas of Magnesia (1776 or 1795)
 Saint Alexis Toth, priest, of Wilkes-Barre, Pennsylvania (1909) (see also: May 7)

New martyrs and confessors

 Martyr Sergius Archangelskiy (1938)
 New Hieromartyr Branko Dobrosavljević, Serbian Orthodox priest who fell victim to Ustaše (1941)

Other commemorations

 Commemoration of the consecration of the Church of St George in Constantinople.
 Uncovering of the relics of Saint Ivo of Ramsey (1001)
 Synaxis of the "Molchenskaya" Icon of the Mother of God (1405)
 Repose of Schemamonk Nicholas of Valaam Monastery (1947)

Icon gallery

Notes

References

Sources
 April 24 / May 7. Orthodox Calendar (pravoslavie.ru).
 May 7 / April 24. Holy Trinity Russian Orthodox Church (A parish of the Patriarchate of Moscow).
 April 24. OCA - The Lives of the Saints.
 The Autonomous Orthodox Metropolia of Western Europe and the Americas. St. Hilarion Calendar of Saints for the year of our Lord 2004. St. Hilarion Press (Austin, TX). p. 31.
 April 24. Latin Saints of the Orthodox Patriarchate of Rome.
 The Roman Martyrology. Transl. by the Archbishop of Baltimore. Last Edition, According to the Copy Printed at Rome in 1914. Revised Edition, with the Imprimatur of His Eminence Cardinal Gibbons. Baltimore: John Murphy Company, 1916. pp. 115–116.
 Rev. Richard Stanton. A Menology of England and Wales, or, Brief Memorials of the Ancient British and English Saints Arranged According to the Calendar, Together with the Martyrs of the 16th and 17th Centuries. London: Burns & Oates, 1892. pp. 177–181.
Greek Sources
 Great Synaxaristes:  24 Απριλίου. Μεγασ Συναξαριστησ.
  Συναξαριστής. 24 Απριλίου. ecclesia.gr. (H Εκκλησια Τησ Ελλαδοσ). 
Russian Sources
  7 мая (24 апреля). Православная Энциклопедия под редакцией Патриарха Московского и всея Руси Кирилла (электронная версия). (Orthodox Encyclopedia - Pravenc.ru).
  24 апреля (ст.ст.) 7 мая 2013 (нов. ст.) . Русская Православная Церковь Отдел внешних церковных связей.

April in the Eastern Orthodox calendar